Bartłomiej Saczuk (born 10 October 1979) is a Polish cyclist. He competed in the men's sprint at the 2000 Summer Olympics.

References

External links
 

1979 births
Living people
Polish male cyclists
Olympic cyclists of Poland
Cyclists at the 2000 Summer Olympics
Sportspeople from Olsztyn